Chincheros is a town in southern Peru, capital of the province of the same name in the Apurímac Region.  As of the last Census in 2012, Chincheros has a total population of 51,583.  
The inhabitants are mainly indigenous citizen of Chanka descent, primarily speaking Quechuan languages.

Geography

Climate
Chincheros has an alpine climate (Köppen ETH) typical for the Peruvian altiplano, bordering upon a subtropical highland climate. Typically for the region, afternoons are pleasant year-round although with extremely intense solar radiation, whilst mornings are freezing, especially during the dry season from April to October.

References

External links
http://www.visitamipais.galeon.com/ 

https://web.archive.org/web/20140516200608/http://munichincheros.gob.pe/

Populated places in the Apurímac Region